The International Supermodified Association (ISMA) is a sanctioning body of short track auto racing in the United States and is the largest sanctioning body of  supermodified type open wheel racing.

History

Founded in 1974 by multi-time Oswego Speedway champions Jim Shampine and Nolan Swift to ensure the future of supermodified racing. With the help of local businessman, Tom Heveron, they formed ISMA as a forum for owners and drivers to express their ideas and opinions as they felt that they were not allowed to do so under the management of Oswego Speedway.

The goals were to upgrade supermodified racing with better safety conditions, more events per season to insure sufficient purses and to aid drivers with their race related problems. The association worked with track managements in making decisions and in discussing ways of improvement. The club encouraged new drivers and owners interested other tracks in supermodified racing and helped to make the division stronger and more well known to a wider audience.

Tom Heveron as President, with the help of Vice President, Jim Shampine and Secretary/Treasurer Fred Graves, led ISMA through its developmental stages. ISMA negotiated with Lancaster for a 40 lap race held on July 3, 1974, which Todd Gibson of Richwood, OH won. The following year ISMA booked races at Fulton Speedway with a $5,000 purse and $1,000 to win.

Starting in 1976, ISMA developed a point fund with tracks contributing $500– $1,000 per race to this fund. Unlike most other point systems, ISMA awards points to the car owners as ISMA is an owners club rather than drivers. Joining the Heveron, Shampine and Graves team, Shirley Letcher took over the responsibility for the point system. In just three seasons, ISMA had accomplished sanctioning over $96,000 in purse money and races, adding a point fund of $4,400 paid by promoters, having tow money at all of the ISMA sanctioned races, having insurance certificates from each promoter on file, and working with other promoters for more races in 1977. Steve Gioia, Jr. became ISMA's first points Champion.

Current
ISMA continues to be at the forefront of supermodified sanctioning bodies, pioneering the franchise system, in which teams purchase a franchise at the beginning of the season. Creating a win-win situation for both the teams and promoters, each of the 19 franchise teams are allowed to miss up to 3 shows during the race season while being guaranteed a minimum starting purse of $1,000 at each event. This system helps to ensure solid, stable car counts and a successful event for the promoter.

ISMA generally sanctions between 13–17 shows a year including two of the prestigious supermodified Triple Crown Series at 1/4-5/8 mile paved short tracks located in 6 states and Canada.

Champions

Competitors notable outside of ISMA:
Bentley Warren- 37 IndyCar Series starts including the 1971 and 1975 Indianapolis 500
Doug Heveron- 96 professional NASCAR starts, 1 IndyCar Series start, attempted 1983 Indianapolis 500
Joe Gosek- Started the 1996 Indianapolis 500
Davey Hamilton- 56 IndyCar Series starts including 14 Indianapolis 500 starts; with a best finish of 4th
Doug Didero- 3 professional NASCAR starts, 6 IndyCar Series starts, attempted 2000 Indianapolis 500
Mike McLaughlin- 318 professional NASCAR starts with 6 wins, 1988 Winston Modified Tour Champion
Johnny Benson Jr.- 503 professional NASCAR starts with 18 wins, 1995 Busch Series Champion, 2008 Craftsman Truck Series Champion, 1993 ASA National Tour Champion
Bobby Santos III- 7 professional NASCAR starts, 2010 NASCAR Whelen Modified Tour champion
Ted Christopher- 29 professional NASCAR starts, 48 NASCAR Modified wins, 2008 Whelen Modified Tour Champion, 2x 24 Hours of Daytona starts

References 

 
Open wheel racing
Companies based in New York (state)
Auto racing series in the United States
Auto racing series in Canada
Auto racing organizations in the United States